The 1949 Tennessee A&I Tigers football team was an American football team that represented Tennessee Agricultural & Industrial State College as a member of the Midwest Athletic Association (MAA) during the 1949 college football season. In their sixth season under head coach Henry Kean, the Tigers compiled a 9–1 record, won the MAA championship, and outscored opponents by a total of 299 to 87. The team was ranked No. 4 among the nation's black college football teams according to the Pittsburgh Courier and its Dickinson Rating System.

Schedule

References

Tennessee A&I
Tennessee State Tigers football seasons
Tennessee A&I Tigers football